RAKBANK is the trading name of the National Bank of Ras Al-Khaimah PJSC, a public joint-stock company headquartered in the Emirate of Ras Al Khaimah, in the United Arab Emirates. It is listed on the Abu Dhabi Securities Exchange (ADX).

Overview
RAKBANK is a retail and business bank in the UAE with assets of AED 52.8 billion, deposits of AED 36.9 billion and net profit of AED 505.4 million at the close of the year 2020. The Bank provides conventional and Islamic retail, small business, and commercial banking services through a network of 27 branches as well as its ATMs, telephone, online and mobile banking channels.

At the start of 2013, the Bank launched an Islamic Banking unit, RAKBANK AMAL, amid a flood of investments in the Shariah (Islamic law)-compliant financial sector in the country. The Islamic banking products and services are offered via its subsidiary, RAK Islamic Finance Company. 
In August 2014, the Bank announced its intention to acquire a majority stake in Ras Al Khaimah National Insurance Company (RAKNIC) following approval from the Bank’s shareholders. Shareholders voted in favour of the Bank buying a majority stake at Dh3.64 per share during its ordinary general assembly held on Monday at the bank’s headquarters in Ras Al Khaimah. The acquisition will be done through an offer to all shareholders of RAKNIC.

Shareholders

The Bank is 52.76% owned by the Government of Ras-Al-Khaimah. The Board consists of several members of the ruling family of the emirate and businessmen from across the UAE and Kuwait.

Services

Awards
 Best Internet Banking Initiative Award at The Asian Banker – Middle East Retail Product Awards 2014 for Click and Collect
 Bank of the Year award at the 2012 Arabian Business Achievement Awards 
 Best Marketing Campaign of the Year award at the Middle East Prepaid Awards 2012 for the MasterCard Bling campaign
 BEST USE OF SEARCH – FINANCE 2019 - RAKBANK

References

External links
Official website

Companies with year of establishment missing
Banks of the United Arab Emirates
Government-owned companies of the United Arab Emirates
Companies based in the Emirate of Ras Al Khaimah